Robinson Gourlay Nicholl "Bob" Wyllie (4 April 1929 – May 1981) was a Scottish footballer who played as a goalkeeper.

Wyllie began his career with hometown club Dundee United and made nearly 100 league appearances before moving to English side Blackpool. After just eleven league appearances, Wyllie moved on to West Ham United and after a similar number of matches, moved on again, this time to Plymouth Argyle. Playing in just a handful of matches at Plymouth, Wyllie saw out his career at Mansfield Town, becoming a regular at Field Mill and by the time he retired from the senior game in 1962, he had made over 200 career league appearances.

Wyllie died in 1981 after settling in Alfreton, Derbyshire.

References

External links

Footballers from Dundee
Scottish footballers
Dundee United F.C. players
Blackpool F.C. players
West Ham United F.C. players
Plymouth Argyle F.C. players
Mansfield Town F.C. players
Scottish Football League players
English Football League players
1929 births
Date of death missing
1981 deaths
Association football goalkeepers